Gymnosphaera is a genus of tree ferns in family Cyatheaceae.

Taxonomy
The genus was originally described by Carl Ludwig Blume in 1828. It was frequently treated by later authors as a synonym of Cyathea or Alsophila.

In the Pteridophyte Phylogeny Group classification of 2016 (PPG I), Gymnosphaera was left as a synonym of Alsophila, as evidence to support its reliable separation was lacking. More recently, Shi-Yong Dong and collaborators proposed the revival and recircumscription of the genus based on additional phylogenetic evidence, an act subsequently accepted by other tree fern workers.

Phylogeny
, the following species are accepted in the genus as currently circumscribed by the Checklist of Ferns and Lycophytes of the World:

Phylogeny of Gymnosphaera

Other species include:

Gymnosphaera alticola Tardieu
Gymnosphaera atropurpurea (Copel.) Copel.
Gymnosphaera boivinii (Mett. ex Ettingsh.) Tardieu
Gymnosphaera bonii (Christ) S.Y.Dong
Gymnosphaera commutata (Mett.) S.Y.Dong
Gymnosphaera henryi (Baker) S.R.Ghosh
Gymnosphaera mildbraedii (Brause) S.Y.Dong
Gymnosphaera nicklesii Tardieu & F.Ballard ex Tardieu
Gymnosphaera ramispinoides (M.Kato) S.Y.Dong
Gymnosphaera rubella (Holttum) S.Y.Dong

References

Cyatheaceae
Pantropical flora
Fern genera